Richard Lowther may refer to:

Sir Richard Lowther (1532–1608), twice High Sheriff of Cumberland and Lord Warden of the West March
Richard Lowther (died 1703) (1638–1703), MP for Appleby 1689–1690
Richard Lowther, 2nd Viscount Lonsdale (1692–1713), English nobleman
Richard Lowther (died 1659) (1583–1659), English lawyer
Richard Lowther (1602-1645), English politician